Ahinoura is a village in Bihar, India. it is situated 9 km distance from its Tehsil (Mohania) and  30 km from its district (Bhabua). Its near by villages are Panapur, Baghini, Turkwaliya and Harnathpur. Nearest towns are Ramgarh (8 km) and Mohania (9 km). It has a high school. People of the village depends on agriculture. A temple of Maa Kali and God Shiva is situated in  village.

Transportation
Nearby Railway station of this village is  Bhabua Road railway station.

External links
Ahinoura on Google Maps

References

Villages in Kaimur district